Kantō Mountains or Kantō Range is a mountain range on the west side of the Kanto Plain in central Japan.  

It stretches from the western part of the Kantō region to the eastern part of the Chubu region and spans Gunma, Saitama, Tokyo, Kanagawa, Nagano, and Yamanashi prefectures.

See also 
Chichibu Mountains
Chichibu Tama Kai National Park
Karisaka pass (Japan's Three Great Passes)
Tanzawa Mountains

References

External links 
 Kantō Range - Britannica

Mountain ranges of Japan
Mountain ranges of Gunma Prefecture
Mountain ranges of Saitama Prefecture
Mountain ranges of Tokyo
Mountain ranges of Kanagawa Prefecture
Mountain ranges of Nagano Prefecture
Mountain ranges of Yamanashi Prefecture